"Leather and Lace" is a song performed by American singers Stevie Nicks and Don Henley. It was released on October 6, 1981, as the second single from Nicks' solo debut studio album Bella Donna (1981).

Nicks wrote the song for Waylon Jennings and Jessi Colter's duet album Leather and Lace, but the song was not included on the album. Nicks' version, a duet with Eagles singer Don Henley, peaked at number six on the US Billboard Hot 100 for three weeks in January 1982.

Record World called it a "magical ballad."

Charts

Weekly charts

Year-end charts

Jeffery Austin and Gwen Stefani remake

Jeffery Austin and Gwen Stefani performed a cover of the song on December 14, 2015, for the season nine finale of The Voice. It was released for digital download simultaneously with the episode's airing.

Charts

References

 Joel Whitburn's Top Pop Singles 1955-2008, 12 Edition

1981 singles
1981 songs
Stevie Nicks songs
Don Henley songs
Gwen Stefani songs
Song recordings produced by Jimmy Iovine
Songs written by Stevie Nicks
Male–female vocal duets
Modern Records (1980) singles